Joy A. Crisp is a planetary geologist specializing in Mars geology. She is noted for her work on NASA missions to Mars, including the Mars Exploration Rovers and Mars Science Laboratory.

Early life and education
Crisp was born in Colorado Springs, CO. She earned a bachelor's degree in geology from Carleton College in 1979, and both a Master's (1981) and a PhD (1984) from Princeton University.  Subsequently, Crisp was a postdoctoral researcher at UCLA for more than two years. Her studies involved investigating rocks from the Canary Islands under conditions similar to those within volcanoes.

Career
Crisp has been a researcher at the Jet Propulsion Laboratory since 1989. She has been a principal scientist there since 2004. Crisp has worked on numerous projects and NASA missions, including the Mars Pathfinder, Mars Exploration Rovers, and Mars Science Laboratory (MSL). She is the deputy project scientist for the MSL Curiosity rover mission.

References

American women astronomers
Living people
Planetary scientists
Women planetary scientists
Princeton University alumni
Carleton College alumni
20th-century American astronomers
21st-century American astronomers
20th-century American geologists
21st-century American geologists
20th-century American women scientists
21st-century American women scientists
Year of birth missing (living people)